The Rochester Raiders were a professional indoor football team based in the Rochester, New York area. They played their home games at Bill Gray's Regional Iceplex in Rochester. The Raiders were previously a member of the Continental Indoor Football League from 2006 to 2008 and the American Indoor Football Association for two exhibition matches in 2008. In 2014, the Raiders came back and played as a member of American Indoor Football (AIF).

The Raiders played in the CIFL championship game twice, both times against the Port Huron / Michigan Pirates. They lost to Port Huron in 2006 but defeated Michigan in 2007. Rochester finished the 2008 regular season undefeated at 12–0; however, the team resigned after their final regular season opponent, the Flint Phantoms, did not show for the game and forfeited.

History

2006
The Rochester Raiders were founded in 2006 as a charter member of the newly created Great Lakes Indoor Football League (GLIFL). The Raiders derived their name from a local flag football team. There were a small number of fans concerned with copyright between the team's logo and the National Football League's Oakland Raiders. However, since the Rochester team never played in California, this was not believed to be of real concern. The Raiders were one of two 2006 teams in the GLIFL that held a television contract, at the time with WBGT-CA, a local low-power station. Games have since been moved to Time Warner Cable SportsNet.

The Raiders' first home venue was the ESL Sports Centre in Brighton (a suburb of Rochester, now known as Bill Gray's Regional Iceplex). The team's 2006 roster featured Syracuse University standout wide receiver Maurice Jackson (who won the inaugural GLIFL Wide Receiver of the Year Award), quarterback Matt Cottengim (the league's inaugural MVP), Darius Smith (the league's inaugural Return Man of the Year), and in January 2006, they signed 2-time Pro Bowler and Super Bowl XXVI Most Valuable Player Mark Rypien to a one-game contract. Rochester went 8–4 under head coach Dennis Greco (on loan from East Rochester High School) during the 2006 regular season and advanced to the postseason. However, they would ultimately fall to the Port Huron Pirates by a score of 40–34 in Great Lakes Bowl I, the GLIFL championship game. After the season, the Raiders moved from the 2,500-seat ESL Sports Centre to the 5,000-seat Main Street Armory in downtown Rochester.

2006 GLIFL standings

2007
In 2007, ultimately the Raiders' only season in the Armory, they finished the regular season with a 10–2 record under new head coach Eddie Long, good for first in the Atlantic Division. In the playoffs, Rochester won the CIFL championship by defeating the previously-unbeaten Michigan Pirates 37–27 in the CIFL Indoor Championship Game on July 28, 2007. Mike Condello was named the game's Most Valuable Player. The game was held at the Blue Cross Arena (a venue with roughly double the capacity of the Main Street Armory) due to a pro wrestling show which was being held at The Armory. The Raiders moved to the Blue Cross Arena full-time beginning with the 2008 season.

2007 CIFL standings

2008
Rochester kept most of its championship-caliber core together, re-signing quarterbacks Mike Mikolaichik, Matt Cottingem, and Omar Baker; running backs Jamil Porter and Dee Glanton; wide receivers Maurice Jackson, Chris Carter, Noah Fahrenbauch, and Derrick Dyer; offensive linemen Mike Kallfeltz and Eric Jendryaszek; linebackers Jason Coley and James Vann; defensive linemen Mike Condello, Terrence Dawson, Steve Marriott, and Tom Parks; defensive backs Chris Shaw, Darius Smith, Makis Whitaker, and Jeff Richardson; and kicker Adam Lanctot. The team also added tight end / defensive end TJ Cottrell (son of Ted Cottrell), wide receiver Darryl Fragger, running back Felix Joyner, defensive lineman Steve Fleming (all three from Port Huron), running back / wide receiver Mark Bly and linebacker Brenton Brady (both from Miami Valley) by way of free agency.

The mix of holdovers from the 2007 club with players from free agency proved to be a winning combination as the team was wildly successful in 2008. They finished the regular season undefeated (12–0; 11–0 in contested games) and won their second straight division title (but first in the Atlantic West Division). However, the Raiders withdrew from the CIFL playoffs on June 8, 2008, after the Flint Phantoms failed to show up for a Sunday afternoon game. The team then immediately moved to the American Indoor Football Association, and played two exhibition matches there, but then announced a move to the Indoor Football League instead. Speculation among fans and league personnel on CIFL message boards is that some Raiders players will play with the new af2 team in Buffalo, New York—which shares ownership with the Raiders—starting in 2009. As part of the deal, Thurman Thomas, who is the other investor in the Buffalo af2 team, will also acquire a share of the Raiders.

2008 CIFL standings

2009

In December 2009, Rochester businessman Bob Bartosiewicz sold his majority share in the team to minority owner and team founder Dave McCarthy, and McCarthy announced that the team would be playing its 2010 home games at the Dome Arena in Henrietta, which has 2,164 seats—the lowest seating capacity of any IFL team, and lower than the previous arenas they used in the GLIFL and CIFL.

2010

On April 23, 2010, McCarthy announced that he was looking to sell part of the team. On June 5, 2010, the Raiders hosted the first outdoor IFL game against the Chicago Slaughter at Marina Auto Stadium. The Raiders won that game 43-36.

2011

In November 2010, the Rochester Raiders announced its cessation of operations.

Professional indoor football would return to the city in 2013, with the announcement of the independent Roc City Thunder taking up residence in the city.

2014
For the 2014 season the Rochester Raiders began play in the American Indoor Football League. After initially announcing plans to return to the Main Street Armory, a scheduling issue prompted the team to instead return to Bill Gray's.

The Raiders suspended operations after the 2014 season with the intent of returning in 2016. The Raiders never returned and a new team called the Rochester Kings would start play in 2017.

Season-by-season record

|-
| colspan="6" align="center" | Rochester Raiders (GLIFL)
|-
|2006 || 8 || 4 || 0 || 2nd League || Won Semifinal (Lehigh Valley)Lost Great Lakes Bowl I (Port Huron)
|-
| colspan="6" align="center" | Rochester Raiders (CIFL)
|-
|2007 || 10 || 2 || 0 || 1st Atlantic || Won AD Semifinal (Chesapeake)Won AD Championship (New England)Won CIFL Indoor Championship Game (Michigan)
|-
|2008 || 12 || 0 || 0 || 1st Atlantic West || Quit league
|-
| colspan="6" align="center" | Rochester Raiders (IFL)
|-
|2009 || 10 || 4 || 0 || 2nd United Atlantic || Lost Divisionals I (River City)
|-
|2010 || 9 || 5 || 0 || 2nd Atlantic East || Won Round 1 (Richmond)  Lost Conference Semi-Final (Wichita)
|-
| colspan="6" align="center" | Rochester Raiders (AIF)
|-
|2014 || 4 || 4 || 0 || 3rd AIF League || Lost Round 1 (Baltimore Mariners)
|-
!Totals || 58 || 23 || 0
|colspan="2"| (including playoffs)
|}

Notable players
Mark Rypien (2006)

Current roster

Current staff
Head coach: Mark Thurston
Assistant coaches: Eddie Long

References

External links
 Raiders' 2006 stats
 Raiders' 2007 stats

 
2006 establishments in New York (state)
2014 disestablishments in New York (state)
Viking Age in popular culture